The Irish language is, since 2022, an official language in Northern Ireland. The main dialect spoken there is Ulster Irish (Gaeilge Uladh). Protection for the Irish language in Northern Ireland stems largely from the European Charter for Regional or Minority Languages.

In the 2021 census, Irish was the main language of 0.3% of the population aged 3 and up, an increase from 0.2% in the previous survey,
while 12.4% of that population had some ability in Irish, also an increase from previous census results.

History

Language in Gaelic Ireland
As in other parts of Ireland, Irish was the main language in the region of present-day Northern Ireland for most of its recorded history. The historic influence of the Irish language in Northern Ireland can be seen in many place names, for example the name of Belfast first appears in the year 668, and the Lagan even earlier ("Logia", Ptolemy’s Geography 2,2,8). The Plantation of Ulster led to a decline in Gaelic culture, of which Irish was part – while some Scottish settlers were Scots-Gaelic speakers, English was made widespread by the plantation. Despite the plantation Irish continued to be spoken in non-planted areas until the mass migration in the 19th century caused by economic factors (see below for further).

Irish Revival in the North
Intellectuals in Belfast took an antiquarian interest in Irish-language culture towards the end of the 18th century, and an Irish-language magazine Bolg an tSolair was published in 1795. The Ulster Gaelic Society was founded in 1830. Attitudes among the Presbyterian middle class, however, tended to change in the second half of the 19th century as the Gaelic Revival became associated with support for Home Rule or Irish Republicanism. The English-born MP for South Londonderry, Thomas Lea proposed an amendment to the draft of the second Home Rule Bill that would have prevented the passing of laws which would increase Irish language use in state schools, legal courts and other public spheres. A branch of the Gaelic League was founded in Belfast in 1895 with a non-sectarian and widely based membership, but the decline in Irish as a first language continued.

Irish was in sharp decline throughout the whole of Ireland from the mid-1800s. From the late 1600s and early 1700s, the Church of Ireland made some attempts to revive the declining Irish language. The church printed Bibles and Prayer Books in Irish, and some churches, and some Protestant clergymen like William King of Dublin, held services in the language. However, the English language had been the language of learning and the Roman Catholic Church continued to use Latin and English in its services. English was the language of the industrial east of the island, and Irish started to become confined to the more rural west.

By the 1860s, of all the Roman Catholic seminaries, only St Jarlath's in Tuam was teaching in Irish. The Roman Catholic Church had, at that time, desired to "stamp out any lingering, semi-pagan remnants", which included the Irish language. Sir William Wilde in 1852 blamed the Catholic Church for the quick decline and was "shocked" by the decline of the language and Gaelic customs after the Famine.

The power of the English language, in business and learning throughout much of the world also influenced the decline of Irish in Ireland. A letter from Dennis Heraghty of Letterkenny in 1886 to the Society for the Preservation of the Irish Language complained that the parents in his area all wanted their children to learn English. Bishop MacCormac of Achonry, also in 1886, suggested that "People are apathetic about the preservation of our ancient language" and, "They see that Shakespeare's tongue is the one in use in America and the Colonies."

Although there had been attempts and societies formed to reverse the declining trend for the language, it was not until the rise of the Gaelic League, founded in 1893, that any measure of success was achieved. By the 1851 census, only 23% of the population of Ireland still spoke Irish as a first language.

Douglas Hyde, in New York in 1905, said, "The Irish language, thank God, is neither Protestant nor Catholic, it is neither a Unionist nor a Separatist." By then, however, the language had begun to be politicised. The Roman Catholic Church in Ireland began to believe in the worth of the language and had begun to take steps to ensure its survival. Ironically, however, both the state and Church interference became something that Irish people began to resent. Protestants and Unionists alike began to back away from an Irish revival as, besides the dominant role of the Roman Catholic Church by then, Irish was starting to be described as a "race" and as a divisive element politically and culturally. James Alexander Rentoul, MP for Down East, stated at Westminster in July 1900 that the Irish language had no value and should not receive any support by the public education system, he stated that Irish-speaking children should be taught exclusively through English and expressed a desire for the Irish language to become extinct. Even so, in 1905 the Irish Unionist Party had an Irish slogan, which it proudly displayed at a convention.

The controllers of the Intermediate Board, the organisation through which public education policy was implemented, attempted to frustrate the improvement of Irish language education provision so severely that the sitting Lord Lieutenant of Ireland, John Hamilton-Gordon, had to write to the Board on 25 July 1906 to see that progress was implemented. In response, John Lonsdale, MP for Mid Armagh and member of the Ulster Unionist Council, claimed that the Gaelic movement which supported the Irish language was simply inspired by hatred of England and all things English. He opposed any teaching of Irish in primary schools as "money wasted" and "useless" as well as claiming that Irish was a vehicle for the dissemination of "seditious views."

Since the partition of Ireland
Following the partition of Ireland into the Irish Free State and Northern Ireland (which remained part of the United Kingdom), the largest Irish-speaking area in the former Province of Ulster; County Donegal; had gone into the Irish Free State. However, there were Gaeltacht areas (communities who continued to speak Irish as their first language) in Northern Ireland at the time; the most prominent of these were the Sperrin Mountains in County Tyrone and Rathlin Island in County Antrim. Since 1921, the Irish language has been regarded with suspicion by many unionists in Northern Ireland, who have associated it with the Republic of Ireland and with Irish republicanism.

The Irish-language movement in Northern Ireland after 1921 responded to a lack of establishment support by pursuing a self-help social and recreational movement aimed at preserving Ulster Irish (an issue which had split the Belfast Gaelic League in 1911). By 1923, only one branch of the Gaelic League was left in operation in Northern Ireland, but from a handful of branches in 1926 the number of branches peaked at 182 in 1946. In contrast to the perception of the Irish Free State's policy of preserving areas of Irish-speaking countryside, activists in Northern Ireland concentrated on ensuring Irish could survive in urban contexts, organising trips to Irish-speaking areas to bolster urban enthusiasm. A co-operative housing scheme in Belfast aimed at creating an urban Gaeltacht opened in 1969 in Shaw's Road.

From the early years of the Northern Ireland government, education in Irish was marginalised. The number of primary schools teaching Irish was halved between 1924 and 1927, and numbers studying Irish as an extra subject fell from 5531 to 1290 between 1923 and 1926. The subsidy for Irish as an extra subject was abolished in 1934.

The Troubles exacerbated the politicisation of the Irish language in Northern Ireland. Many republicans in Northern Ireland, including former Sinn Féin President Gerry Adams, learned Irish while in prison.

The last speakers of varieties of Irish native to what is now Northern Ireland died in the 20th century. Irish as spoken in Counties Down and Fermanagh were the first to die out, but native speakers of varieties spoken in the Glens of Antrim and the Sperrin Mountains of County Tyrone and County Londonderry survived into the 1950s and 1970s respectively, whilst the Armagh dialect survived until the 1930s or '40s. Varieties of Irish indigenous to the territory of Northern Ireland finally became extinct when the last native speaker of Rathlin Irish died in 1985. Séamus Bhriain Mac Amhlaigh, who died in 1983, was reportedly the last native-speaker of Antrim Irish. A wealth of recordings and stories told by Mac Amhlaigh were recorded by researchers from Queen's University in Belfast.

Status

Most Irish speakers in Ulster today speak the Donegal dialect of Ulster Irish.

Irish received official recognition in Northern Ireland for the first time in 1998 under the Good Friday Agreement, and status as an official language in 2022. A cross-border body known as Foras na Gaeilge was established to promote the language in both Northern Ireland and the Republic, taking over the functions of Bord na Gaeilge.

The British government in 2001 ratified the European Charter for Regional or Minority Languages. Irish (in respect only of Northern Ireland) was specified under Part III of the Charter, thus giving it a degree of protection and status comparable to the Scottish Gaelic in Scotland. This included a range of specific undertakings in relation to education, translation of statutes, interaction with public authorities, the use of placenames, media access, support for cultural activities and other matters (a lower level of recognition was accorded to the Ulster variant of Scots, under Part II of the Charter). Compliance with State obligations is assessed periodically by a Committee of Experts of the Council of Europe. 

The Education (Northern Ireland) Order 1998 states: "It shall be the duty of the Department (of Education) to encourage and facilitate the development of Irish-medium education."

A question about the Irish language was asked until the 1911 census of Ireland, but after partition was not included in the Northern Ireland census until it was reintroduced in 1991. According to the 2001 Census, 658,103 people (36% of the population) had "some knowledge of Irish" – of whom 559,670 were Catholics and 48,509 were Protestants and "other Christians".

Knowledge of Irish by people over the age of 3 (2001 Census):
 Speaks, reads, writes and understands Irish: 223,678 
 Speaks and reads but does not write Irish: 160,183
 Speaks but does not read or write Irish: 108,596
 Understands spoken Irish but cannot read, write or speak Irish: 87,479
 Has other combination of skills: 78,167
 No knowledge of Irish: 1,152,760

The ULTACH Trust (Iontaobhas ULTACH) was established in 1989 by Irish language enthusiasts to attract funding from the British Government for language projects and to broaden the appeal of the language on a cross-community basis (among both Protestants and Catholics)

The Shaw's Road Gaeltacht was joined in 2002 by the Gaeltacht Quarter in west Belfast.

Citizenship services
The lack of provision for legal and citizenship services in the Irish language, including for the Life in the United Kingdom test, has been met with criticism from the Committee of Experts of the European Charter for Regional or Minority Languages, of which the UK has ratified for the Cornish language, the Irish language, Manx Gaelic, the Scots & Ulster Scots dialects, Scottish Gaelic and the Welsh language. In a 2014 report detailing the application of the charter in the UK, the Committee were given no justification for the inequality in the treatment of Irish speakers in contrast to that of English, Scottish Gaelic and Welsh speakers, and that efforts to rectify the inequality were non-existent.

Education

Six families in Belfast established a Gaeltacht area in Belfast in the late 1960s and opened Bunscoil Phobal Feirste in 1970 as the first Irish-medium school in Northern Ireland, and in 1984 was granted the status of a voluntary maintained primary school. The first Naíscoil (Irish-medium nursery school) opened in 1978. Not long after the opening of Bunscoil Phobal Feirste, a second all-Irish primary school opened, Gaelscoil na bhFál, situated on the Falls Road. Founded by the parents of children that wanted Irish education but couldn't find a space in 'BPF', one of the parents, named Sue Pentel, played a major role in the making of the school and about two years after the opening of Gaelscoil na bhFál, a daycare service, Ionad Uíbh Eachach, was opened and founded and managed by Sue Pentel. The school and daycare both provide services through the Irish language and work together in the way that many of the children that attended Ionad Uíbh Eachach then go on to attend nursery- Primary 7 (Naí ionad- R7) in Gaelscoil na bhFál. This is a very valuable connection that not that many schools have and what with the Ionad providing after-school care it is both convenient for the school and parents.

Comhairle na Gaelscolaíochta (CnaG) is the representative body for Irish-medium Education.  It was set up in 2000 by the Department of Education to promote, facilitate and encourage Irish-medium Education. One of CnaG's central objectives is to seek to extend the availability of Irish-medium Education to parents who wish to avail of it for their children. Irish language pre-schools and primary schools are now thriving and there are official Irish language streams in secondary schools in Maghera, Donaghmore, Castlewellan and Armagh.

In December 2014 Minister for Education for Northern Ireland John O'Dowd announced that the Department of Education were going to set up Northern Ireland's second gaelcholáiste in Dungiven Castle in County Londonderry. Gaelcholáiste Dhoire opened in September 2015.

In the academic year 2018/19, over 6,000 children are enrolled in Irish-medium education:
43 nurseries (Naíscoileanna) with over 1,000 pupils
35 primary schools (Bunscoileanna) with over 3,000 pupils
2 second level gaelscoileanna (Gaelcholáiste) with over 800 pupils
3 Irish language streams (Sruith Lán-Ghaeilge)

The British Council administers a scheme to recruit Irish language assistants for English-medium schools in Northern Ireland.

In 2013, there were 309 entries for A-Level examinations in Irish and 2,078 for GCSE.

Media

BBC Radio Ulster began broadcasting a nightly half-hour programme, called Blas ('taste'), in Irish in the early 1980s, and there is now an Irish-language programme on the station every day. BBC Northern Ireland broadcast its first television programme in Irish in the early 1990s, SRL ('etc.'). In March 2005, TG4 began broadcasting from the Divis transmitter near Belfast, as a result of agreement between the Department of Foreign Affairs and the Northern Ireland Office. Following Digital Switchover for terrestrial television transmissions in both parts of Ireland in 2012, TG4 is now carried on Freeview HD for viewers in Northern Ireland (channel 51) as well as to those households in Border areas that have spillover reception of the ROI Saorview platform (channel 104). TG4 also continues to be available on other TV delivery platforms across Northern Ireland: Sky (channel 163) and Virgin Cable customers in Belfast (channel 877).

RTÉ's Irish-language radio station, RTÉ Raidió na Gaeltachta based in the Republic of Ireland is also available in many areas in Northern Ireland. Raidió Fáilte a community radio station based in West Belfast covers the Greater Belfast area and started broadcasting in 2006 and broadcasts 24 hours per day seven days per week. It broadcasts a selection of programmes; music, chat, news, current affairs, sports, arts, literature, environmental and community issues. It is also available worldwide on the internet at RaidióFáilte.com.

Residents of Northern Ireland have access to web based media in Irish such as online newspaper Tuairisc.ie or online lifestyle magazine Nós. An Irish-language daily newspaper called Lá Nua ("new day") folded in 2008 due to lack of funding.

The Northern Ireland Film and Television Commission administers an Irish Language Broadcast Fund (announced by the Secretary of State for Northern Ireland in April 2004) to foster and develop an independent Irish-language television production sector in Northern Ireland. The European Commission authorised public funding for the fund in June 2005 considering that "since the aid aims to promote cultural products and the Irish Language, it can be authorised under EU Treaty rules that allow state aids for the promotion of culture".

Political use
The Irish language in Northern Ireland has long been a matter associated with identity. Prior to the turn of the 20th century, the Irish language was embraced by both sides of the community, although in decline. But the partition of Ireland in 1921 was a turning point to attitudes towards the language. Nationalists in Northern Ireland who had been abandoned by their southern counterparts felt that the Irish language was a significant marker of identity they now needed as a minority group.

During The Troubles the Irish language became increasingly politicised. Its survival is largely due to families in the nationalist Shaw's Road area of west Belfast during the 1960s who tried to make the area Gaeltacht (an Irish speaking area). A second wave of the Irish language revival movement in Northern Ireland during the 1970s occurred on another site – the Maze Prison. For republican prisoners, learning the Irish language in prison (aka 'Jailtacht') became the way in which to set themselves apart from the British authorities.

More widely, this use of the Irish language inspired many nationalists in Northern Ireland to use the language as a form of cultural expression and resistance from the British occupation. In particular, the Irish language has been used extensively by the republican party Sinn Féin who have been criticised by unionists for hijacking the Irish language for political gain.

The use of the Irish language by republicans has therefore led to it receiving mixed responses from unionist communities and politicians. In many unionist communities the Irish language is regarded as a foreign language or the language of terrorists and therefore – unlike Catholic communities – in Protestant communities its inclusion in school curriculum and public notices continues to be strongly opposed. On the other hand, some moderate nationalists have been reluctant to use Irish too due to the negative connotations associated with the language's use.

The issue around the use of the Irish language was once again intensified when a unionist MLA was accused of mocking Irish in the Northern Irish Assembly. In November 2014, in response to a question about minority language policy the DUP's Gregory Campbell said "Curry my yoghurt can coca coalyer" in what was meant to sound like "Thank you, speaker" in Irish which he later claimed was in an attempt to make a point about the continued political use of the language by some Sinn Féin MLAs in post 1998 Good Friday Agreement.

In recent years cross-community efforts have been made to make the Irish language more appealing to both sides of the community. Many local councils now use Irish bilingually with English (sometimes with Ulster Scots too) on many of its services in an attempt to neutralise the language. Some former loyalist prisoners such as Robin Stewart have even taken up learning the Irish language in east Belfast in an attempt to reclaim Irish identity and challenge Republicans about their version of Irish history and what it means to be Irish. The former Red Hand Commando prisoner William Smith learnt the language whilst in jail. The motto of the Red Hand Commando was the Irish phrase Lamh Dhearg Abu which translated means 'Red Hand to Victory'. Linda Ervine, the sister-in-law of former Ulster Volunteer Force member and politician David Ervine, began learning the language and set up the Turas Irish-Language Project in the predominately Unionist East Belfast area for others to learn the language in 2011.

See also
 An Cumann Gaelach, QUB
 Comhairle na Gaelscolaíochta
 Forbairt Feirste
 Languages of Northern Ireland
 Líofa
 Líonraí Gaeilge
 Literature in the other languages of Britain
 Identity and Language (Northern Ireland) Act 2022
 Irish language in Britain
 POBAL

References

External links
 List of Irish-medium schools in Northern Ireland
 Foras na Gaeilge
 Ultach Trust
 Comhairle na Gaelscolaíochta
 BBC Northern Ireland Irish language
 Pobal
 In the trenches of a language war

Irish language
Irish culture
Languages of Northern Ireland
Culture of Northern Ireland